CFGE-FM is a French-language Canadian radio station located in Sherbrooke, Quebec. The station airs an adult contemporary format, and is part of the Rythme FM network which operates across much of Quebec. The station's transmitter is located at Mount Bellevue.

Owned and operated by Cogeco, it broadcasts on 93.7 MHz using a directional antenna with an average effective radiated power of 7,412 watts and a peak effective radiated power of 25,500 watts (class B). Since its transmitter site is located at Mount Bellevue, the station has (unlike competitors CITE-FM-1 and CIMO-FM) good coverage in the city of Sherbrooke, but because of severe deficiencies in covering neighbouring Magog, the station operates a relay there, CFGE-FM-1, which broadcasts on 98.1 MHz using a directional antenna with an average effective radiated power of 360 watts and a peak effective radiated power of 900 watts (class B).

The station received CRTC approval in 2003.

On August 28, 2009, CFGE-FM received CRTC approval to increase their effective radiated power (ERP) to 7,412 watts, its maximum ERP to 25,550 watts), increasing its effective HAAT from 158.9 to 207.1 metres, and by relocating its transmitter.

References

External links
93.7 Rythme FM
 

Fge
Fge
Fge
Fge
Radio stations established in 2004
2004 establishments in Quebec